Michael Kaase Aondoakaa, SAN (born 12 June 1962) is Nigeria's former justice minister in office from July 2007 to 10 February 2010.

Background

Michael Kaase Aondoakaa was born in Benue on 12 June 1962. He went to school at Mount Saint Gabriel's Secondary School Makurdi and upon graduation was admitted into the Faculty of Law, University of Maiduguri where he  obtained his LL.B Certificate. He became a senior partner of a law firm for 18 years.

While helping two of his friends, Ogiri Ajene, former deputy governor of Benue State and Professor Daniel Saror to secure nomination for ministerial appointment, he was invited to meet President Umaru Musa Yar'Adua, and during the interview was offered the post of Attorney General until February 10, 2010 when he was removed in controversial circumstances by the Acting President Goodluck Jonathan.

Attorney general

He was appointed Minister of Justice on 26 July 2007. He was a member of a sub-committee to review the report of Justice Mohammed Uwais committee on electoral reform. The sub-committee assisted in producing a white paper which sparked controversy because it reversed some recommendations of the Uwais committee. It recommended that the President continue to appoint the chairman of Independent National Electoral Commission (INEC), among other changes.

He opposed sacking Maurice Iwu, chairman of INEC, despite criticism of Iwu's conduct of the 2007 elections. He objected to the dissolution of local governments in Ondo State by Olusegun Mimiko, the new governor, although a High Court in Ondo supported the action.

The United States diplomatic cables leak turned out that the drug company Pfizer had hired private investigators to find evidence against Aondoakaa to pressure him into dropping charges against the company over claims that a new antibiotic had caused harm to children. In 2010, he was stripped of the rank of Senior Advocate of Nigeria by  the  Legal Practitioners Disciplinary Committee on the strength of several petitions written against him for actions taken while in Office as Attorney General of the Federation. The rank has since been restored to him.  Upon leaving office, Aondoakaa became a rice farmer and his company remains one of the biggest local producers and processors of rice in Nigeria.

References

1962 births
Living people
Justice ministers of Nigeria
People from Benue State
University of Maiduguri alumni
20th-century Nigerian lawyers
Attorneys General of Nigeria
Senior Advocates of Nigeria